Carl Friedrich Adolph Scheppig (18 January 1803 in Berlin, † 22 February 1885 in Sondershausen) was a key architect of the late Neoclassicism in Germany and major student of the Berlin architect Karl Friedrich Schinkel.

He worked successfully mainly in Berlin and Sondershausen.

Some Works 
Building repair at the German Cathedral and French Cathedral in Berlin
Construction manager in revamping the palace of Prince Karl of Prussia in Berlin
Construction manager for the remodeling of the Jerusalem's Church in Berlin
Transformation of the residential palace in Sondershausen
Construction of the district court, the prison and the stables of Sondershausen

Sources 
 Apfelstedt, F. Bau- und Kunstdenkmäler des Fürstenthums Schwarzburg-Sondershausen, Erstes Heft: Die Unterherrschaft, 1886
 Kulturamt der Stadt Sondershausen. Persönlichkeiten in Sondershausen, 1993

1803 births
1885 deaths
Architects from Berlin
19th-century German architects